Events in the year 2018 in Austria.

Incumbents
 President: Alexander Van der Bellen
 Chancellor: Sebastian Kurz

Governors
 Burgenland: Hans Niessl 
 Carinthia: Peter Kaiser
 Lower Austria: Johanna Mikl-Leitner
 Salzburg: Wilfried Haslauer Jr.
 Styria: Hermann Schützenhöfer
 Tyrol: Günther Platter
 Upper Austria: Thomas Stelzer
 Vienna: Michael Häupl (until 24 May); Michael Ludwig (from 24 May)
 Vorarlberg: Markus Wallner

Events

February
2-3 February — Cyclone Burglind

12 February — Niklasdorf train collision

May
 May 28 – Austrian Chancellor Sebastian Kurz announces to cut benefit for foreigners at 564 euros.he says “The fundamental rule we will introduce is that German will become the key to accessing the full minimum benefit,” “That means that whoever has insufficient language skills will not be able to claim the full minimum benefit".

June
 June 8 – Austrian Chancellor Sebastian Kurz announces its closing seven mosques and could expel up to 40 imams from the country. the mosques were accused of preaching Salafi positions and they were funded by turkey.

Deaths

1 January – Konrad Ragossnig, classical guitarist (b. 1932).
13 January – Walter Schuster, alpine skier (b. 1929)
19 January – Ute Bock, educator and humanitarian (b. 1942).

26 February – Thomas Pernes, composer (b. 1956)

3 March – Franz Pacher, engineer (b. 1919)

21 March – Martha Wallner, actress (b. 1927)

20 July – Heinz Schilcher, footballer (b. 1947).

24 October – Rudolf Gelbard, Holocaust survivor (b. 1930)

References

 
2010s in Austria
Years of the 21st century in Austria
Austria
Austria